The BR-265 is a Brazilian federal highway.

It is mostly composed of a single track and has sections in the middle of mountains, in the Zona da Mata, as well as sections in the middle of farms, mainly in the Southwest region of Minas.

References

Federal highways in Brazil